Better is a British crime drama television drama series, created and written by Sam Vincent and Jonathan Brackley, about a corrupt police officer who attempts to turn her life around, only for it to get much worse. The series began broadcast on BBC One on 13 February 2023, with all episodes available on BBC iPlayer simultaneously.

Plot
After her son almost dies, corrupt police detective Lou Slack attempts to make amends for her sins and escape Col McHugh, the powerful criminal she has been working for.

Cast

Main
 Leila Farzad as DI Lou Slack
 Andrew Buchan as Col McHugh
 Samuel Edward-Cook as Ceri Davies
 Zak Ford-Williams as Owen Davies
 Olivia Nakintu as DC Esther Okoye
 Cel Spellman as Donal McHugh
 Anton Lesser as Vernon Marley

Recurring
 Carolin Stoltz as Alma McHugh
 Lucy Black as DCI Sandy Mosby
 Moe Bar-El as Artem
 Mark Monero as Curtis "Lord" Roy
 Junade Khan as DS Pritam Khan
 Joseph Steyne as Joleon

Episodes

Reception
Sean O'Grady from The Independent gave the first episode four out of five stars, praising Farzad and Buchan. Rebecca Nicholson of The Guardian awarded the first episode three stars out of five, criticising the opening but finding it gained momentum by the end. Anita Singh in The Telegraph also gave it three stars out of five, unimpressed by the plot.

References

External links 
 

2023 British television series debuts
2020s British drama television series
2020s British crime drama television series
BBC television dramas
English-language television shows
Police corruption in fiction
Television shows set in England